Béni Egressy (born Galambos Benjámin; 21 April 1814 – 17 July 1851 in Sajókazinc) was a Hungarian composer, librettist, translator and actor. He created a number of popular melodic compositions, including the one to Mihály Vörösmarty's patriotic poem Szózat. He also authored the librettos of the operas Hunyadi László and Bánk bán by Ferenc Erkel.

Biography
Egressy was born in 1814 in Sajókazinc, today a part of Kazincbarcika, Borsod-Abaúj-Zemplén County, Hungary, to a Protestant pastor.

He entered the stage in 1834, like his older brother Gábor Egressy, and in 1837 became a member of the national theatre in Prague. During the Revolution of 1848, he took part in the fighting and became a member of the Hungarian Honvéd resistance. He was wounded in the Battle of Kápolna and was present during the defense of Komárom under György Klapka, where he wrote the Klapka March. After the rebellion, he received amnesty and returned to the stage.

Works
Egressy was more notable for his acting rather than his compositions. Nevertheless, he composed music for "The Szózat", a famous poem by Hungarian poet Mihály Vörösmarty. The song later became the unofficial "second Hungarian national anthem", besides the Himnusz. His musical works are characterised by a wealth of melodies, having many of the attained great popularity in his homeland.

See also
 Gábor Egressy (actor)

Gallery

References

1814 births
1851 deaths
19th-century classical composers
19th-century Hungarian male actors
19th-century Hungarian writers
19th-century Hungarian male writers
19th-century male musicians
Burials at Kerepesi Cemetery
Hungarian classical composers
Hungarian expatriates in the Czech lands
Hungarian male classical composers
Hungarian male stage actors
Hungarian Romantic composers
Opera librettists
People from Kazincbarcika